Iain Boal is an Irish social historian of technics and the commons, based as an independent scholar in Berkeley, California and London.

Biography
He was one of the co-founders of the Retort collective, an association of radical writers, teachers, artists, and activists in the Bay Area from the 1990s to the present. He co-edited Resisting the Virtual Life: The Culture and Politics of Information (1995). He co-authored Afflicted Powers: Capital and Spectacle in a New Age of War (2001), along with T.J. Clark, Joseph Matthews and Michael Watts. In 2012, he published The Green Machine - a world history of the bicycle (Notting Hill Editions, out of print). As of 2022, he was working on an edited volume Archives of Dissent, which is under contract to be published by PM Press. He has also been working on a book about The Long Theft: Episodes in the History of Enclosure.

The historians Robert Proctor and Londa Schiebinger have credited Boal with coining the term "Agnotology" in 1992  to describe the intentional production of ignorance or doubt, often for commercial gain. Originally conceived to explain the behavior of tobacco companies, it has gained more recent currency in the context of commercially motivated climate change denial.

Personal life
He is married to the archivist Gillian Boal.

Publications
 Boal, Iain and James Brook, Resisting the Virtual Life: The Culture and Politics of Information City, (San Francisco: City Lights Books, 1995)
 As member of Retort, "Blood for Oil?" in London Review of Books (2005) 
 As member of Retort, Afflicted Powers: Capital and Spectacle in a New Age of War (2009)

References

Year of birth missing (living people)
Living people
20th-century Irish historians
21st-century Irish historians
Social historians
Writers from Berkeley, California
Independent scholars
Irish expatriates in the United States